Howard Berger (born 20 December 1964) is a special make-up effects creator who is best known for his work on The Chronicles of Narnia films. He has over 200 films to his credit since 1977.

Berger is the co-founder of KNB EFX Group along with Robert Kurtzman and Greg Nicotero. The company specializes in prosthetic makeup, better known as special make-up effects, and has worked on over 400 film and television projects.

Berger also often works with Sam Raimi who he has been working with since 1986. Most recently they worked together on Oz the Great and Powerful.

He also has won an Emmy for the makeup in the TV show The Walking Dead.

Oscar nominations
Both of these are in Best Makeup

78th Academy Awards-The Chronicles of Narnia: The Lion, the Witch and the Wardrobe. Shared with Tami Lane. Won.
85th Academy Awards-Nominated for Hitchcock, nomination shared with Peter Montagna and Martin Samuel. Lost to Les Misérables.

Personal life

He has 3 children, named Kelsey, Travis, and Jake.

References

External links

1964 births
Living people
Best Makeup Academy Award winners
Best Makeup BAFTA Award winners
Primetime Emmy Award winners
American make-up artists
People from Burbank, California